The following are the association football events of the year 1988 throughout the world.

Events 
 March 27 – Cameroon wins the 1988 African Cup of Nations by defeating Nigeria: 1–0. The only goal in Casablanca's Stade Mohammed V is scored by Emmanuel Kundé from a penalty kick.
 June 25 – Thanks to goals from captain Ruud Gullit and top goalscorer Marco van Basten, the Netherlands defeat the Soviet Union (2–0) in the final of UEFA Euro 1988 in Munich.
 July 12 – Italian club Juventus receive The UEFA Plaque in Geneva (Switzerland) as first club in European football history to win the three main UEFA club competitions.
 1988 Copa Libertadores – won by Nacional after defeating Newell's Old Boys on an aggregate score of 3–1.
 England – FA Cup – Wimbledon won 1–0 over Liverpool.
 The Football League celebrates its Centenary.
 With great surprise worldwide FIFA gives the 1994 FIFA World Cup to United States.
 August 24 – The Faroe Islands record their first international victory, defeating Canada 1–0.
 September 14 – Thijs Libregts makes his debut as the manager of Dutch national team with a 1–0 win over Wales, replacing successful coach Rinus Michels.
 October 1 – Soviet Union wins the Olympic gold medal in football by defeating Brazil: 2–1 after extra time in Seoul's Olympic Stadium.
 December 11 – Uruguay's Nacional wins the Intercontinental Cup in Tokyo, Japan by defeating Dutch PSV Eindhoven on penalties (7–6), after the match ended in 2–2.

National club championships winners

Asia

Europe

North and South America

International tournaments 
African Cup of Nations in Morocco (March 13 – 27 1988)
 
 
 
Olympic Games in Seoul, South Korea (September 17 – October 1, 1988)
 
 
 
UEFA European Football Championship in West Germany (June 10 – 25 1988)
 
 
  and

Games of national teams

Births

January
 4 January: 
 Anestis Argyriou, Greek footballer
 Maximilian Riedmüller, German footballer
 8 January: 
 Vitaliy Hoshkoderya, Ukrainian footballer
 Adrián López, Spanish footballer
 Michael Mancienne, English footballer
 9 January: Marc Crosas, Spanish footballer
 20 January: 
 Uwa Elderson Echiéjilé, Nigerian international
 Jougle (Jougle Manoel Rodrigues), Brazilian footballer
 Jeffrén Suárez, Spanish footballer
 23 January: Marko Šimić, Croatian junior international
 28 January: Alaa Ali, Egyptian footballer (d. 2019)

February
 3 February: Pouria Gheidar, Iranian footballer
 4 February: Sergei Yuvenko, Russian professional football player
 12 February: Nicolás Otamendi, Argentine international football player
 23 February: Nicolás Gaitán, Argentine international football player
 24 February: Levi Hanssen, New Zealand/Faroe Islands footballer
 28 February: Jorge Gastélum, Mexican footballer
 29 February:
 Mikel Balenziaga, Spanish footballer
 Fabiano Ribeiro de Freitas, Brazilian footballer
 Scott Golbourne, English footballer
 Benedikt Höwedes, German footballer
 Viktor Prodell, Swedish footballer
 Evgeni Cheremisin, Russian footballer
 Hamza Ziad, Algerian footballer

March
 18 March: Matthieu Onoseke, Democratic Republic of the Congo footballer
 21 March: Lee Cattermole, English footballer

April
 3 April: Tim Krul, Dutch international
 11 April: Oleg Sibalov, Russian professional football player

May
 4 May: Michael Ludäscher, Swiss footballer
 17 May: Jennison Myrie-Williams, English youth international
 23 May: Angelo Ogbonna, Italian footballer
 25 May: Adrián González Morales, Spanish junior international
 29 May: Alex Porfirio, Brazilian footballer

June
 1 June: Javier Hernández, Mexican international football player
 15 June: Cristopher Toselli, Chilean footballer
 24 June: Micah Richards, England international footballer

July
 2 July: Abderahmane Hachoud, Algerian international footballer
 6 July: Gustavo Mencia, Paraguayan footballer
 18 July: Elvin Mammadov, Azerbaijani international
 19 July: Azrul Azmi, Malaysian footballer

August
 1 August: Yousef Al-Reshedi, Saudi Arabian footballer
 5 August: Eddie Nolan, Irish international footballer
 28 August: Ray Jones, English footballer (d. 2007)

September
 2 September: Javi Martínez, Spanish international footballer
 5 September:
 Nuri Şahin, Turkish footballer
 Felipe Caicedo, Ecuadorian association footballer
 13 September: Luis Rentería, Panamanian international footballer (died 2014)
 18 September:
 Mateusz Jeleń, Polish footballer
 Ferdinand Sinaga, Indonesian international
 23 September: Anthony Straker, English footballer

October
 7 October – Diego Costa, Spanish international
 14 October
Will Atkinson, English footballer
Mario Titone, Italian footballer
 15 October: Mesut Özil, German international football player

November
 15 November: Sascha Imholz, Swiss footballer
 23 November: Juha-Pekka Inkeröinen, Finnish club footballer

December
 10 December: 
Wilfried Bony, Ivorian international footballer
Mitchell Donald, Dutch footballer
Neven Subotić, Serbian international footballer

Deaths 

 January 27 – Kemal Faruki, Turkish football player (77)
 February 8 – Pietro Arcari, Italian forward, winner of the 1934 FIFA World Cup and one of four Italian players who won the FIFA World Cup while never being capped. (78)
 February 26 – Euclydes Barbosa, Brazilian defender, semi-finalist at the 1938 FIFA World Cup. (82)
 March 13 – Rodolpho Barteczko, Brazilian striker, semi-finalist at the 1938 FIFA World Cup. (77)
 March 16 – Erich Probst, Austrian football player (60)
 October 19 – Marcos Carneiro de Mendonça, Brazilian goalkeeper, the inaugural goalkeeper for Brazil National Football Team and winner of the 1919 South American Championship and 1922 South American Championship. (93)

References

External links 
 Rec.Sport.Soccer Statistics Foundation 
 VoetbalStats 

 
Association football by year